TerraMaster Technology Co., Ltd. (pinyin: tiěwēimǎ) is a Chinese company that specializes in computer software, network attached storage (NAS), and direct attached storage (DAS). Its headquarters is in Shenzhen, Guangdong, China. Its main peers and competitors include Synology and QNAP, which are well-known Taiwanese companies that also specialize in computer data storage.

History 
TerraMaster was founded in Shenzhen, China in 2010, and is a professional brand which focuses on storage products, including network attached storage and direct attached storage.

The name TerraMaster was coined from the Greek prefix tera- and the English word master.

Products 
TerraMaster's products are sold in more than 40 countries. Its main products are focused on network attached storage (NAS) and direct attached storage (DAS).
 Personal/Home Cloud Storage
 Small/Medium Business Network Storage
 Enterprise Network Storage Server
 Home/SOHO RAID Storage
 Video Professional RAID Storage

See also 
List of NAS manufacturers
Synology Inc.
QNAP Systems, Inc.
Network-attached storage
Direct-attached storage

References

External links 

Network-attached storage
Computer storage companies
Electronics companies established in 2010
Companies based in Shenzhen